The Southwestern Proving Ground Officers Quarters Historic District is a residential historic district encompassing most of the town of Oakhaven, Arkansas.  Located at the western end of Oakhaven Road, the district includes 20 houses built in 1941 to provide housing for military officers serving at the Southwestern Proving Ground, of which this area was then a part.  After World War II came to an end, the properties were sold off to local veterans, who incorporated Oakhaven soon afterward.  The houses are all two story wood-frame structures resting on brick foundations.  Most of the houses have hip roofs, although those reserved for the highest-ranking officers had gable roofs.  They are typically three bays wide with a center entry, and feature modest Colonial Revival styling.

The district was listed on the National Register of Historic Places in 2008.

See also
Southwestern Proving Ground Building No. 4
Southwestern Proving Ground Building No. 5
Southwestern Proving Ground Building No. 129
National Register of Historic Places listings in Hempstead County, Arkansas

References

Historic districts on the National Register of Historic Places in Arkansas
Colonial Revival architecture in Arkansas
Residential buildings completed in 1941
Hempstead County, Arkansas
National Register of Historic Places in Hempstead County, Arkansas
Military facilities on the National Register of Historic Places in Arkansas
1941 establishments in Arkansas